The Caernarfon & District League was a football league covering the Caernarfon and surrounding areas in North Wales.

League History
The league was a renamed version Bangor & District League that had run between 1930 and 1937 and again after the Second World War, between 1945 and 1950. The change in name reflected the changing geographic locations of clubs playing in the league.

The first season of the league took place in 1950–51 and featured the following eight sides:

Abersoch Athletic
Caernarfon YMCA
Cesarea Rovers
Mountain Rangers
Nefyn United 
Seiont Rovers
Talysarn Celts
Waenfawr

The 1950–51 launch was overshadowed by the formation of a second division to the north's top League, the Welsh League (North). The effect meant that the league did not operate in 1951-52, but was re-formed for the following season with a membership of seven. This number grew to thirteen by the mid-1950s and the league, compared to previous times, prospered. There was a reduction in membership during the early 1960s but this was corrected and by the 1980s the league was well established as one of North Wales' top junior Leagues. Many clubs in the area used the league for their reserve teams and this was particularly the case during the 1980s following the setting up of the Gwynedd League as an intermediate step between the League and the Welsh League (North).

Hit by falling team numbers the league disbanded after the 2013–14 season.

Clubs in the final 2013–14 season
The following teams featured in the league in the final season played.

Barmouth & Dyffryn United reserves
Blaenau Ffestiniog Amateur reserves	
Caernarfon Borough (resigned from the league)	
Harlech Town
Llanberis reserves
Llanrug United reserves
Nefyn United reserves
Pwllheli reserves (resigned from the league)		
Talysarn Celts	
Y Felinheli

League Champions

1950s

1950–51: – Cesarea Rovers
1951–52: – No league in operation
1952–53: – Nefyn United
1953–54: – Nefyn United
1954–55: – Nefyn United
1955–56: – Criccieth Town
1956–57: – Bangor Athletic
1957–58: – Penrhos United
1958–59: – Penrhos United
1959–60: – Penrhos United

1960s

1960–61: – Carmel Locals
1961–62: – Llanberis Athletic
1962–63: – Llanberis Athletic
1963–64: – Llanberis Athletic
1964–65: – Llechid Celts
1965–66: – Llanberis Athletic
1966–67: – Llechid Celts
1967–68: – Llanberis Athletic
1968–69: – Llanberis Athletic
1969–60: – Mountain Rangers

1970s

1970–71: – Llanberis Athletic
1971–72: – Llanrug United
1972–73: – Coleg Normal Bangor
1973–74: – Talysarn Celts
1974–75: – Mountain Rangers
1975–76: – Mountain Rangers
1976–77: – Pwllheli & District reserves
1977–78: – Llanrug United
1978–79: – Llanrug United
1979–80: – Llanberis Athletic

1980s

1980–81: – Llanberis Athletic
1981–82: – Y Felinheli
1982–83: – Y Felinheli
1983–84: – Pwllheli & District reserves
1984–85: – CPD Penrhyndeudraeth
1985–86: – CPD Penrhyndeudraeth
1986–87: – Nefyn United
1987–88: – CPD Bontnewydd
1988–89: – Llanrug United reserves
1989–90: – Locomotive Llanberis reserves

1990s

1990–91: – Penrhos United
1991–92: – Bangor Waterloo
1992–93: – Caernarfon Athletic
1993–94: – Caernarfon Borough
1994–95: – CPD Deiniolen
1995–96: – Coleg Normal Bangor
1996–97: – Coleg Normal Bangor
1997–98: – Bethesda Athletic
1998–99: – Caernarfon Town reserves
1999–2000: – Nefyn United

2000s

2000–01: – Nantlle Vale
2001–02: – CPD Porthmadog reserves
2002–03: – Barmouth & Dyffryn United
2003–04: – CPD Bethel
2004–05: – CPD Bontnewydd
2005–06: – Llanllyfni
2006–07: – CPD Llanystumdwy
2007–08: – Rhiwlas
2008–09: – Caernarfon Wanderers
2009–10: – Bangor City reserves

2010s

2010–11: – Llanllyfni
2011–12: – CPD Waunfawr
2012–13: – Mynydd Llandegai
2013–14: – Y Felinheli

Number of titles by club

 Llanberis Athletic – 9 titles
 Nefyn United – 5 titles
 Llanrug United – 4 titles
 Penrhos United – 4 titles
 Coleg Normal Bangor – 3 titles
 Y Felinheli – 3 titles
 Mountain Rangers – 3 titles
 Bethesda Athletic – 2 titles
 Llechid Celts – 2 titles
 Llanllyfni – 2 titles
 CPD Bontnewydd – 2 titles
 CPD Penrhyndeudraeth – 2 titles
 Pwllheli & District reserves – 2 titles
 Bangor Athletic – 1 title
 Bangor City reserves – 1 title
 Bangor Waterloo – 1 title
 Barmouth & Dyffryn United – 1 title
 Caernarfon Athletic – 1 title
 Caernarfon Borough – 1 title
 Caernarfon Town reserves – 1 title
 Caernarfon Wanderers – 1 title
 Carmel Locals – 1 title
 Cesarea Rovers – 1 title
 CPD Bethel – 1 title
 CPD Deiniolen – 1 title
 CPD Llanystumdwy – 1 title
 CPD Porthmadog reserves – 1 title
 CPD Waunfawr  – 1 title
 Criccieth Town – 1 title
 Mynydd Llandegai – 1 title
 Nantlle Vale – 1 title
 Rhiwlas – 1 title
 Talysarn Celts – 1 title

References

Football leagues in Wales
1950 establishments in Wales
2014 disestablishments in Wales
Sports leagues established in 1950
Sports leagues disestablished in 2014
Caernarfon
Caernarfonshire
Defunct football competitions in Wales